The women's 3000 metre relay in short track speed skating at the 2006 Winter Olympics began with the semifinals, on 12 February, and concluded with the final on 22 February, at the Torino Palavela.

Records
Prior to this competition, the existing world and Olympic records were as follows:

No new world and Olympic records were set during this competition.

Results

Semifinals
The two semifinals, taking place on 12 February, matched four teams, each with four skaters on the ice, with the top two in each advancing to the A final. The other teams advanced to the B Final.

Semifinal 1

Semifinal 2

Finals
Two of the teams participating in Final A changed their teams between the semifinal and final rounds; Canada replaced Amanda Overland with Anouk Leblanc-Boucher and South Korea replaced Kang Yun-mi with Jeon Da-hye. China crossed the line in third place, but was disqualified when Wang Meng was adjudged to have interfered with a Canadian skater. This moved Italy up to the bronze medal position.

Final A

Final B

References

Women's short track speed skating at the 2006 Winter Olympics